The Shire of Quilpie is a local government area in South West Queensland, Australia.

The dominant industry is grazing. Opal fields are also worked within the shire.

In June 2018, the Shire of Quilpie had a population of 790, having fallen by -3.5 per cent over the preceding year, the second fastest decline in the state.

History
Margany (also known as Marganj, Mardigan, Marukanji, Maranganji) is an Australian Aboriginal language spoken by the Margany people. The Margany language region includes the landscape within the local government boundaries of the Quilpie Shire, taking in Quilpie, Cheepie and Beechal extending towards Eulo and Thargomindah, as well as the properties of Dynevor Downs and Ardoch.

The Shire was created on 17 July 1930 from parts of the Shires of Barcoo, Murweh and Paroo and part of the abolished Shire of Adavale and all of the abolished Shire of Bulloo. However, on 4 July 1931, the Shire of Bulloo was re-instated.

Chairmen and mayors

Chairmen
 1930-1933 H. J. Pegler

Mayors
 1997–2012: P. David Edwards
 2012–present: Stuart Alexander Mackenzie

Towns and localities
The Shire of Quilpie includes the following settlements:

 Quilpie
 Adavale
 Cheepie
 Eromanga
 Toompine

Amenities 
Quilpie Shire Council operates a public library at Quilpie.

Population

Notable people from Quilpie
 Vaughan Johnson, Queensland state politician
 Ewen Jones, Australian federal politician
 Professor Don Markwell, social scientist and educational leader
 Sandy McPhie, former Queensland state politician
 Justine Saunders, late Australian actor

References

Further reading

External links
 University of Queensland: Queensland Places: Quilpie and Quilpie Shire

 
Local government areas of Queensland
South West Queensland
1930 establishments in Australia